Henry Wendell Jordan (January 26, 1935 – February 21, 1977) was an American professional football player who was a defensive tackle for 13 seasons in the National Football League with the Cleveland Browns and Green Bay Packers.  He played in the NFL from 1957 to 1969 and is a member of the Pro Football Hall of Fame.

Early years
Born in Emporia, Virginia, Jordan graduated in 1953 from Warwick High School, Newport News, VA in 1953. He played college football at the University of Virginia, where he was the captain of the football team as a senior.  Jordan was also an All-American wrestler, the ACC champion and NCAA runner-up in 1957. He was a member of the Beta chapter of Sigma Nu fraternity at UVA.

NFL career
Jordan was selected in the fifth round of the 1957 NFL draft by the Cleveland Browns, who traded him two years later to the Green Bay Packers in Vince Lombardi's first season for a fourth-round draft choice. At Green Bay, Jordan was elected to four Pro Bowls (1960, 1961, 1963, and 1966), and he was the Pro Bowl MVP in 1961. Jordan was All-NFL seven times, and he was a defensive leader on a Green Bay Packers team that won five of six NFL title games in eight seasons and won the first two Super Bowls.

A tenacious competitor on the field, Jordan was the vibrant and jovial wit among Lombardi's Packers, and was highly regarded by his teammates. Highly quotable, his outgoing personality put him in demand as an after-dinner speaker.

Most notably: “Lombardi treats us all the same, like dogs.”

After football
Jordan retired at age 35 in February 1970, after an injury-filled 1969 season. In 1970, Jordan relocated south to Milwaukee to create and oversee Summerfest.

In 1974 Jordan was inducted into the Virginia Sports Hall of Fame. In 1975 he was inducted into the Green Bay Packers Hall of Fame.

In 1977, seven years after leaving Green Bay, Jordan died at age 42 of a heart attack after jogging on February 21, 1977.

In 1995, Henry Jordan was inducted into the Pro Football Hall of Fame.

He was represented in the coin toss ceremony at Super Bowl XXIX by former teammate Ray Nitschke, who was also named to the NFL's 75th Anniversary team.  The ceremony brought together former NFL stars of the 1950s, 1960s, 1970s, and 1980s, with surviving members of that year's Hall of Fame class representing the latter decade (one of them, then-Congressman Steve Largent flipped the coin on their behalf).

In 2000, the Warwick High School athletics field (Newport News, VA) was named in his honor.

In May 2009, he was named to the Hampton Roads Sports Hall of Fame, which honors athletes, coaches and administrators who contributed to sports in southeastern Virginia.

References

External links
 
 Packers.com  – Henry Jordan
 
 Warwick High School  – Henry Jordan Scholarship
 

1935 births
1977 deaths
American football defensive tackles
Cleveland Browns players
Green Bay Packers players
Sportspeople from Newport News, Virginia
Players of American football from Virginia
University of Virginia alumni
Western Conference Pro Bowl players
Virginia Cavaliers football players
Pro Football Hall of Fame inductees